Notable persons with the surname Woolner include:
Alfred Cooper Woolner, (1878–1936), Sanskrit scholar
Bernard Woolner (1910–1977), co-founder of the Woolner Brothers film company
Christopher Woolner (1893–1984), British Army officer
Keith Woolner (born c. 1968), American baseball analyst
Lawrence Woolner (1912–1985), American film producer
Thomas Woolner (1825–1892), English sculptor and poet